Miss America 2018 was the 91st Miss America pageant, though the Miss America Organization celebrated its 97th anniversary in 2017. This discrepancy is due to no national pageants being held from 1928-1932 or in 1934 because of financial problems associated with the Great Depression. The 2018 pageant was held in Boardwalk Hall in Atlantic City, New Jersey on Sunday, September 10, 2017. This was the first Miss America pageant to be held in Atlantic City since the Miss America Organization headquarters relocated to Boardwalk Hall.

The event was broadcast by the American Broadcasting Company (ABC).

On July 24, 2017, it was announced that Chris Harrison and Sage Steele would be returning to co-host the Miss America pageant for the second year in a row.

Cara Mund of North Dakota became Miss America 2018 at the end of the event.

Overview

Judges

Preliminary judges
From September 6–8, 2017, judges for the preliminary competition selected the winners of the preliminary talent and lifestyle and fitness competitions as well as the top 15 finalists for the final night of competition on September 10, 2017.  The panel included entertainment lawyer, Carolyn Conrad; Global Government Affairs and Policy leader for Baker Hughes, Karen Knuston; CNN White House reporter, Kate Bennett; casting director, Patrick Rush; actor, Rusty Joiner; Miss America 1978, Susan Perkins Botsford; and dancer and actress, Vivian Nixon.

Final night judges
The panel of judges on the final night of competition on September 10, 2017 included country singer, Thomas Rhett; actress, author, and model, Molly Sims; Grammy-nominated singer and actress, Jordin Sparks; People Magazine's Editor in Chief, Jess Cagle; journalist, actress, and CEO of AfterBuzz TV, Maria Menounos; Miss America 2014, Nina Davuluri; and Olympic gold medalist, Tara Lipinski.

Results

Placements

§ America's Choice

Awards

Preliminary awards

Quality of Life awards

Children's Miracle Network (CMN) National Miracle Maker awards

STEM Scholarship awards

Women in Business Scholarship awards

Other awards

Contestants

References

2018
2017 beauty pageants
2017 in New Jersey
2017 in the United States
September 2017 events in the United States
Events in Atlantic City, New Jersey